Leptorhabdos is a monotypic genus of flowering plants, initially classified in Scrophulariaceae, and now within the broomrape family Orobanchaceae. It contains a single species, Leptorhabdos parviflora.

It thrives in steppes, rivers, and lake banks, from Caucasus and Iran to Central Asia and Himalayas.

Etymology 

The synonym name Dargeria is a taxonomic anagram derived from the name of the confamilial genus Gerardia. The latter name is a taxonomic patronym honoring the English botanist John Gerard.

References 

Orobanchaceae genera
Parasitic plants
Monotypic Lamiales genera
Orobanchaceae